Çeltek is a Turkish word meaning "shepherd's apprentice" and may refer to the following places in Turkey:

 Çeltek, Aksaray, a village in the district of Aksaray, Aksaray Province
 Çeltek, Gölbaşı, a village in the district of Gölbaşı, Ankara Province
 Çeltek, Vezirköprü, a village in the district of Vezirköprü, Samsun Province
 Çeltek, Yeşilova